Nationality words link to articles with information on the nation's poetry or literature (for instance, Irish or France).

Events

Works published
 Cristóbal de Castillejo, Works of Castillejo Expurgated by the Inquisition, published posthumously in Madrid, Spain
 Philippe Desportes, Les premières œuvres de Philippe Desportes, which had circulated widely in manuscript form and were largely love poems (in imitation of minor Italian poets), including "Les Amours de Diane", "les Amours d’Hippolyte", "Élégies", France
 Johann Fischart (writing under the pen name "Hultrich Elloposcleron") and another author, The Flea Hunt, a burlesque; a flea complains to Jupiter about the hard treatment it receives from women; Fischart wrote the second part, in which women reply and are defended; Germany
George Gascoigne, A Hundred Sundry Flowers, Great Britain
 Torquato Tasso, Aminta, pastoral verse drama, Italy
 Pontus de Tyard, Nouvell'Œuvres poétiques, France

Births
 December 21 – Mathurin Régnier (died 1613), French satirical poet, nephew of Philippe Desportes
 Also:
 Thomas Heywood, born about this year (died 1641), English playwright, actor and miscellaneous author
 Richard Johnson (died 1659), English romance writer, playwright and poet
 Daniel Naborowski (died 1640), Polish
 Martin Peerson born sometime from 1571 to this year (died December 1650 or January 1651), English composer, organist and virginalist writing hymns, madrigals and other sacred and secular music
 Samuel Rowlands, born about this year (died 1630), English author of pamphlets in prose and verse

Deaths
 February – William Lauder (born 1520), Scottish cleric, playwright and poet
 July – Étienne Jodelle (born 1532), French poet and playwright
 November – Giovanni Battista Giraldi, who gave himself the nickname "Cinthio", also rendered "Cynthius", "Cintio" or, in Italian, "Cinzio" (born 1504), Italian novelist, writer, poet and playwright
 Also:
 Brne Karnarutić (born 1515), Croatian Renaissance poet and writer
 Andrea Rapicio (born 1533), Italian, Latin-language poet
 Ján Silván (born 1493), Slovak

See also

 Poetry
 16th century in poetry
 16th century in literature
 Dutch Renaissance and Golden Age literature
 Elizabethan literature
 French Renaissance literature
 Renaissance literature
 Spanish Renaissance literature

Notes

16th-century poetry
Poetry